John Williams Walker (August 12, 1783April 23, 1823) was an American politician, who served as the Democratic-Republican United States senator from the state of Alabama, the first senator elected by that state.

Life and career
Walker was born August 12, 1783 in Amelia County, Virginia, of Scots-Irish heritage, the son of Rev. Jeremiah Walker and Mary Jane Graves. He was educated at the prestigious Willington Academy of Dr. Moses Waddel near Petersburg, Georgia, and received degrees in 1806 and 1809 from Princeton University. He studied law, and was admitted to the bar at Petersburg.

In 1808, Walker married Matilda Pope, daughter of LeRoy Pope and Judith Sale, and in 1810, he followed his father-in-law to settle in the new town of Huntsville, Mississippi Territory (now Alabama), and there began the practice of law.

Upon the formation of the Alabama Territory in 1817, Walker served as a representative from Madison County to the first territorial legislature in 1818. In the second session, he served as speaker. In 1819, he was president of the convention that framed Alabama's first constitution, which enabled Alabama's admission to the United States.

On October 28, 1819, Walker was elected by an almost unanimous vote of the state legislature as the first United States senator from Alabama. He served from December 14, 1819 until his resignation on December 12, 1822 on account of his failing health. He died in Huntsville on April 23, 1823, and is buried in Maple Hill Cemetery. Walker County, Alabama, established December 20, 1824, is named in his honor.

Walker was the father of LeRoy Pope Walker, Confederate secretary of war and brigadier general; Richard Wilde Walker, Confederate States senator; Percy Walker, United States representative; and several other children.  He was also grandfather of Richard Wilde Walker, Jr., Alabama Supreme Court Justice and a judge in the 5th U.S. Circuit Court of Appeals, and American diplomat John Walker Fearn, who served as Minister of Serbia, Romania and Greece from 1885 to 1889.

Notes

References 
 Owen, Thomas McAdory, History of Alabama and Dictionary of Alabama Biography. Vol. IV. Chicago: S. J. Clarke, 1921. Reprinted with an introduction by Milo B. Howard, Jr. Spartanburg, SC: Reprint Company, 1978.
 Alabama Territory. Journal of the House of Representatives of the Alabama Territory, First Session, First General Assembly, February 1818. St. Stephens, Alabama Territory: Thomas Eastin, 1818. Full text online at website of Alabama Legislature.
 Alabama Territory. Journal of the House of Representatives of the Alabama Territory, Second Session, First General Assembly, November 1818. St. Stephens, Alabama Territory: Thomas Eastin, 1818. Full text online at website of Alabama Legislature.
 State of Alabama. Journal of the House of Representatives of the General Assembly of the State of Alabama, First Annual Session, 1819. Cahawba, Alabama: State Press, 1820. Full text online at website of Alabama Legislature.

1783 births
1823 deaths
Princeton University alumni
Members of the Alabama Territorial Legislature
Alabama lawyers
Politicians from Huntsville, Alabama
Democratic-Republican Party United States senators from Alabama
19th-century American politicians
Walker family
Lawyers from Huntsville, Alabama
19th-century American lawyers